Chef Clyde Serda (born July 3, 1952) is an American chef and writer. Well known in the industry as “Chef Clyde” he has been a writer for The Culinarian Magazine for over thirteen years. He has worked at notable restaurants including Commander's Palace, New Orleans and The World Trade Club, San Francisco, and owned and operated the business Simply Outrageous Catering in the San Francisco Bay Area. Over the years Serda has written several articles in the culinary field as well as appeared on TV spots and published many recipes. Serda has worked on the Board of Directors for the Chef Association of the Pacific Coast and has served as a past President for two terms. He is currently Chairman for the prestigious Antonin Carême Medal Trustees.

Currently Serda is working as a Food Consultant / Corporate Chef for Arnabal International. He also works as a private chef instructor and culinary event coordinator. Serda is a Certified Master Food Taster. He is a former member of the Culinary Advisement Board and is currently a substitute Chef Instructor for Job Corp Treasure Island, San Francisco. He has published his first cook book Just the Cook and has been working on his second cook book History in the Eating.

Chef is also a hardline Republican that follows Ted Cruz on Facebook and trolls his opponents.

Awards 
Chef of the Year: San Francisco, Chefs Association of the Pacific Coast, 1996
Antonin Carême Medal: San Francisco, Chefs Association of the Pacific Coast, 1997
Presidential Medallion: United States of America, American Culinary Federation, 1997

Publications 
 Serda, Clyde. Just the Cook: Trials, Tribulations and Recipes for a Catering Chef 2006 
 The California Culinary Academy.  In the World Kitchen: Global Cuisine from California Culinary Academy 2001 
 Serda, Clyde. https://web.archive.org/web/20070912022844/http://www.sfchefs.org/education.html.
 Serda, Clyde. Education Column https://web.archive.org/web/20110827022452/http://sfchefs.org/January01.pdf.
 Serda, Clyde. Education Column https://web.archive.org/web/20110827022516/http://sfchefs.org/November01.pdf.
 Serda, Clyde. Education Column https://web.archive.org/web/20110827022322/http://sfchefs.org/December01.pdf.
 Serda, Clyde. Education Column https://web.archive.org/web/20110827022430/http://sfchefs.org/February02.pdf.
 Serda, Clyde. Education Column https://web.archive.org/web/20110827022256/http://sfchefs.org/April02.pdf.
 Serda, Clyde. Education Column https://web.archive.org/web/20070911165722/http://www.sfchefs.org/pastissues.html.

References 
 Serda, Clyde. https://web.archive.org/web/20080409182209/http://www.sfchefs.org/.
 Serda, Clyde. Just the Cook: Trials, Tribulations and Recipes for a Catering Chef 2006 

1952 births
Living people
American chefs
American male chefs
Writers from San Francisco
American restaurateurs